The Totsuka Station is an interchange passenger railway station located in Totsuka-ku, Yokohama, Japan, operated by the East Japan Railway Company (JR East) and the Yokohama City Transportation Bureau.

Lines

Station layout
JR Totsuka Station is a ground level station with two island platforms serving four tracks, with an additional set of  freight tracks on the west side. The platforms are connected to the station's two gates upstairs (over the tracks) and downstairs (underground). The station has a Midori no Madoguchi staffed ticket office. The Yokohama Subway station, connected with the JR underground concourse, has one underground island platform.

JR East platforms

Yokohama Municipal Subway platforms

History

JR East

Totsuka Station was opened on July 11, 1887 as a station on the Japanese Government Railways (JGR), the predecessor to the post-war Japanese National Railways (JNR). The station building was originally on the west side of the station. The east gate was added in 1937. The current building over the tracks was completed on March 26, 1969.

On March 15, 1930 when Yokosuka Line trains were replaced by electric multiple units, all Tokaido Line trains ceased to stop at Totsuka Station.
Before the Tokaido Line and Yokosuka Line were separated and the station became a junction of the two lines on October 1, 1980, the two lines used the same tracks, but only Yokosuka Line trains stopped at Totsuka Station. The current platforms 1 and 2 did not exist, and the platform 1 (now platform 3) served the Tokyo-bound Yokosuka Line, while line 2 (now line 4) served the away-from-Tokyo direction. Additionally, the current freight lines did not exist, with the old freight lines located where the current platforms 1 and 2 are. From March 1973 when one island platform was added, there were two island platforms, with platform 2 serving the Tokyo-bound trains, and platform 3 serving the other direction. The lines on platforms 1 and 4 were built, but were not used until 1980.

Originally, the station handled both passengers and freight. In 1923, a separate freight yard was completed as a part of the station to the north of the passenger platforms across the crossing with Tōkaidō Highway. All freight operations were discontinued from May 1970. As the addition of the new freight lines claimed the land of the bus terminal in front of the station's west gate, the bus terminal was relocated to the site of the former freight yard in July 1971. The bus terminal is now called the Second Bus Center and is distinguished from the larger Bus Center beside the Totsukana building on the same side of the station.

With the privatization of the JNR on April 1, 1987, the station came under the operational control of JR East. Shōnan-Shinjuku Line trains and Narita Express limited express services began stopping at Totsuka Station from December 1, 2001.

The timetable was revised on March 18, 2007, so that Tokaido Line Acty rapid trains all stopped at this station. This resolved the confusing situation that existed before, when the Shonan-Shinjuku Line rapid and special rapid trains stopped at the station, but Tokaido Line Acty services did not. Before the change, it was also the only station for changing trains at which the Acty did not stop. As before, the Tokaido Line commuter rapid still do not stop at this station.

Yokohama Municipal Subway
The Blue Line of the Yokohama Subway connected to Totsuka Station from May 24, 1987 with temporary facilities. The permanent subway station was opened on August 27, 1989.

Accidents
At 05:42 on December 15, 1923, local passenger train No. 21 to  collided with the locomotive and a wagon of freight train No. 603, which was blocking the main line. Two locomotives and two wagons were overturned. As a result, the driver of train No. 603 was killed instantly and three passengers were slightly injured. The cause of the accident was a signalman's carelessness according to the official record of the railway.

At 09:52 on July 27, 1939, about 500 workers of a nearby Nippon Kōgaku factory entered the track near the station to see off a colleague. The semi-express train No. 221 to  hit some of them, killing eight and injuring seven.

Passenger statistics
In fiscal 2019, the station was used by an average of 112,598 passengers daily (boarding passengers only). In fiscal 2019, the Yokohama Municipal Subway station was used by an average of 44,137 passengers per day (boarding passengers only), making it the second busiest station on the Blue Line (after Yokohama)

The daily passenger figures (boarding passengers only) for previous years are as shown below.

See also
 List of railway stations in Japan

References

External links

 JR Totsuka Station  
 Yokohama Subway Totsuka Station 

Railway stations in Kanagawa Prefecture
Railway stations in Japan opened in 1887
Yokosuka Line
Blue Line (Yokohama)
Stations of Yokohama City Transportation Bureau
Shōnan-Shinjuku Line
Tōkaidō Main Line